Gary William Gallagher is an American historian specializing in the history of the American Civil War.  Gallagher is currently the John L. Nau III Professor in the History of the American Civil War at the University of Virginia. He produced a lecture series on the American Civil War for The Great Courses lecture series.

Life and career
Gallagher received a Bachelor of Arts from Adams State College in 1972.  He then did graduate study in history at the University of Texas at Austin, receiving a Master of Arts in 1977 and a Ph.D. in 1982. He was a professor of history at Pennsylvania State University from 1986 to 1998, when he joined the faculty at the University of Virginia.

He is the presenter of an Audible series of lectures entitled The American Civil War. An in depth look at the American Civil War. These are currently available on Audible as a series of read lectures which go into great detail on the Civil War. He both wrote and read the lecture series as part of The Great Courses. The series has 48 lectures, each averaging about 30 minutes, meaning more than 24 hours of lectures in total. This is presented exclusively for Audible books.

In 2021, Gallagher received The Lincoln Forum's Richard Nelson Current Award of Achievement.

Works

Authored Books 
 with Joan Waugh: The American War: A History of the Civil War Era. State College, Pennsylvania: Spielvogel Books, 2015
Becoming Confederates: Paths to a New National Loyalty. Athens: University of Georgia Press, 2013.
The Union War. Cambridge, Mass.: Harvard University Press, 2011. (Winner of 2012 Tom Watson Brown Book Prize, 2012 Laney Prize, 2011 Eugene Feit Award in Civil War Studies; The New York Times Book Review Editors’ Choice)
Causes Won, Lost, and Forgotten: How Hollywood and Popular Art Shape What We Know about the Civil War. Chapel Hill: University of North Carolina Press, 2008.
Lee and His Army in Confederate History. Chapel Hill: University of North Carolina Press, 2001.
The American Civil War: The War in the East 1861-May 1863. Oxford: Osprey Publishing, 2000. (History Book Club selection)
Lee and His Generals in War and Memory. Baton Rouge: Louisiana State University Press, 1998. (Winner of 1998 Fletcher Pratt Award; History Book Club selection)
The Confederate War. Cambridge, Mass.: Harvard University Press, 1997. (Winner of 1998 Laney Prize and finalist for 1998 Lincoln Prize [shared the prize with three other books]; History Book Club selection)
Stephen Dodson Ramseur: Lee's Gallant General. Chapel Hill: University of North Carolina Press, 1985. (History Book Club Selection)

Edited Books 
 
 
 
 with Alan T. Nolan:

References

External links
Gary W. Gallagher on C-SPAN

Living people
Adams State University alumni
University of Texas at Austin College of Liberal Arts alumni
University of Virginia faculty
21st-century American historians
American male non-fiction writers
1950 births
21st-century American male writers